James Hickey (c. 1886 – 7 June 1966) was an Irish Labour Party politician who joined the short-lived breakaway National Labour Party. He served four terms as Lord Mayor of Cork.

Hickey was one of twelve children in his family and was a native of Ballinagar, Mallow, County Cork. He was educated at Rahan national school, and moved to Cork City in 1913. At the age of 27, he found employment first with the Cork Steam Packet Company and later with John Daly & Co, then-manufacturers of Tanora. He joined the Labour Party about this time and became a trade union official. In 1931 he married Eileen Kiernan, and they had four children.

Hickey first stood for the Dáil at the 1937 general election for the Cork Borough constituency, but narrowly missed being elected. He was successful at the 1938 general election, unseating Richard Anthony, a former Labour TD who left the Party in the 1920s and sat as an independent. His filled the role of former Lord Mayor Seán French, who died in office in September 1937, and stayed in the role afterwards.

Hickey made international headlines in February 1939, when, as Lord Mayor of Cork, he refused to give a civic reception to the captain and crew of the German warship SMS Schlesien which was on a 'courtesy visit' to Cork Harbour flying the Nazi flag, despite Irish neutrality. The Schlesien was a 13,000 tonne World War I battleship. Hickey's reasoning for refusing to entertain the German crew was stated to be a slight by the German media on the occasion of the death of Pope Pius XI some time earlier. Hickey said, "the insult given to the Catholic world on the death of the Pope, when the responsible German Press termed our Holy Father a political adventurer".

Hickey lost his seat in the 1943 Irish general election.

Hickey was one of the six prominent members who left Labour in 1944 to form the National Labour Party, and it was as a National Labour Party candidate that he was defeated at the 1944 general election. He was re-elected at the 1948 election as a National Labour candidate, and after the split in Labour was healed, he was returned to the Dáil for a final time at the 1951 general election.

After his defeat at the 1954 general election (to his running mate, Seán Casey), he stood unsuccessfully for election to Seanad Éireann. He was later nominated to the 8th Seanad by the Taoiseach John A. Costello.

He was the first chairman of the Cork Branch of the Irish Red Cross Society and was active in the Catholic Young Men's Society. He died in 1966 at his home in St. Luke's Cross, Cork and was buried at the cemetery in Rahan.

References

 

1880s births
1966 deaths
Labour Party (Ireland) TDs
National Labour Party (Ireland) TDs
Members of the 10th Dáil
Members of the 13th Dáil
Members of the 14th Dáil
Members of the 8th Seanad
Local councillors in Cork (city)
Lord Mayors of Cork
Place of birth missing
Place of death missing
Nominated members of Seanad Éireann
Labour Party (Ireland) senators